Yuriy Shtyn, (born 1 January 1967 in the town of Khodoriv located in Lviv Oblast, Ukraine) is a Ukrainian-Canadian musician, composer and producer. He is the younger brother of Rostyslav Shtyn and was the lyricist and composer for the bands Strus Mozgu and Opalnyi Prynz, and producer of the project which came later called Loony Pelen.

Biographical 

References

1967 births
Living people
Ukrainian composers